is a Japanese racing driver currently competing in Super GT and Super Formula for Real Racing, and B-Max Racing.

Early career

Karting
Born in Saitama, Matsushita began his racing career in karting in 2005, competing the All-Japan Junior Kart Championship. In 2008, he clinched the championship title in the Open Masters Kart ARTA Challenge. He ended his karting participations in 2010, finishing third in the KF1 category of the All Japan Kart Championship.

Formula Pilota China and Formula Challenge Japan
In 2011, Matsushita graduated to single–seaters into the Formula Pilota China with the Super License team. He missed the Ordos round, but after his returning he showed better performance than in the first part of the season. He won the final race of the season at Sepang and finished the season fourth.

For 2012, he switched to the Formula Challenge Japan mono-series. He scored ten podiums in twelve races, including five wins and took the championship title.

All-Japan Formula Three

2013 
In 2013, Matsushita stepped up to the All-Japan Formula Three Championship with the HFDP Racing. He collected five podiums and another seven point-scoring finishes, to end the season fifth in the series standings, it was the best result for the Honda driver.

2014 
For the next season he decided to stay in the series with the same team. He was victorious at Motegi, Fuji and Sugo, grabbing the championship title from Kenta Yamashita with a twelve-point gap.

GP2 Series and FIA Formula 2

2015 
Matsushita made his début in the GP2 Series in 2015 with ART Grand Prix. In the first race at Bahrain, he qualified second on the grid opposite teammate Stoffel Vandoorne and finished in the points in both races, setting the fastest lap in the sprint race. At the Red Bull Ring, Matsushita took his first GP2 podium by finishing third in the sprint race. He took his first victory in the sport in the sprint race at the Hungaroring as part of an ART 1-2. He finished 9th in the overall standings.

2016 
In February 2016, it was announced Matsushita would reunite with ART for a second season, alongside fellow 2015 rookie Sergey Sirotkin.
Matsushita was suspended for the 4th round of the season in Austria due to erratic driving at the previous event in Baku.

2017 
In 2017, Matsushita competed in the inaugural Formula 2 championship, driving for ART Grand Prix alongside Alexander Albon. He scored his first win in the sprint race in Spain, and his second one during the sprint race in Hungary. He scored two more podiums, in Monaco and in Monza and finished sixth in the final standings, beating Albon by 45 points.

2019 
He won the feature races at the Red Bull Ring and in Monza. He, again, finished 6th in the championship, two positions above his teammate.

2020 
He was announced to drive for MP Motorsport in the 2020 FIA Formula 2 Championship together with Brazilian Felipe Drugovich. Matsushita announced that he would be leaving the F2 Championship with immediate effect on 22 September 2020.

Formula One
On 20 February 2016, Matsushita was signed as a development driver for McLaren.

Super Formula and Super GT career

Super Formula
In 2018, Matsushita returned to Japan to compete in Super Formula for Honda team Dandelion. He returns to the series in 2020 racing with B-Max Racing, where he replaces Sérgio Sette Câmara who moved to Formula E. He continues racing with B-Max once again, competed from the second round. For 2022, he stays again with the same team. Matsushita clinched his first win of the series in Suzuka. For 2023, Matsushita continues racing with B-Max once again.

Super GT

2020 
Matsushita made his debut in the Japanese Super GT Series in the last two rounds of the 2020 season, replacing Shinichi Takagi – who had sustained injuries from a crash in a Super Taikyu race – in the Honda NSX GT3 Evo of ARTA in the GT300 class. Driving alongside co-driver Toshiki Oyu, the pair finished the races at Motegi and Fuji Speedway eighth and seventh, respectively. After He left Honda, Matsushita moves to their manufacturer's rival Nissan where he stepped up to GT500 racing with Team Impul alongside Kazuki Hiramine. Both pairs wins their first GT500 race, and clinched 8th in the standings. Matsushita returns to Honda, and moves to Real Racing to partner up with Koudai Tsukakoshi switching with Bertrand Baguette who moves to the other team.

2021 
For the 2021 season, Matsushita decided to join Nissan in the GT500 class, despite having been a Honda junior throughout his career. He was placed at Team Impul alongside Kazuki Hiramine. The duo won the fifth round at Sportsland Sugo, ending a five year win drought for the Impul team. They nearly also won round seven at Motegi, but Hiramine ran out of fuel on the final lap while leading, although he was able to coast to the finish in third. They finished the season eighth in the championship, the best result for Nissan drivers that year.

Racing record

Career summary

Complete GP2 Series results
(key) (Races in bold indicate pole position) (Races in italics indicate fastest lap)

Complete FIA Formula 2 Championship results
(key) (Races in bold indicate pole position) (Races in italics indicate points for the fastest lap of top ten finishers)

Complete Super Formula results
(key) (Races in bold indicate pole position) (Races in italics indicate fastest lap)

‡ Half points awarded as less than 75% of race distance was completed.

Complete Super GT results
(key) (Races in bold indicate pole position) (Races in italics indicate fastest lap)

‡ Half points awarded as less than 75% of race distance was completed.

References

External links
  
 

1993 births
Living people
Sportspeople from Saitama (city)
Japanese racing drivers
Formula Masters China drivers
Japanese Formula 3 Championship drivers
Formula Challenge Japan drivers
GP2 Series drivers
MRF Challenge Formula 2000 Championship drivers
FIA Formula 2 Championship drivers
Super Formula drivers
Carlin racing drivers
MP Motorsport drivers
Super GT drivers
Euroformula Open Championship drivers
ART Grand Prix drivers
Dandelion Racing drivers
Team Aguri drivers
Motopark Academy drivers
B-Max Racing drivers